This was the first edition of the event, and was won by Tristan Lamasine and Nils Langer who beat Saketh Myneni and Sanam Singh in the final 1–6, 6–3, [10–8].

Seeds

Draw

Main draw

References
 Main Draw
 Qualifying Draw

Vietnam Open (tennis) - Doubles
2015 Doubles